Dr. Roi Ankhkara Kwabena (born: Fitzroy Cook Jr. 23 July 1956 – 9 January 2008) was a Trinidadian cultural anthropologist, who worked with all age ranges in Europe, Africa, Latin-America and the Caribbean for over 30 years. He died in England, where he had relocated.

Life and career
Kwabena was born in Port of Spain, Trinidad, where he was educated. At the age of 14, he published his first poem, "Why Black Power", which he also performed at a Black Power rally. His first collection, Lament of the Soul, appeared three years later, and marked the beginning of a prolific body of work over the following three decades, including other poetry collections, journals, essays, children's stories and the thesis Marijuana (1981). At the same time, he founded the publishing co-operative Afroets Press, and Bembe Productions, a cultural collective whose objective was the propagation of creative expression from the Caribbean and its diaspora.

In commemoration of UN's International Literacy Year 1990 he was "Writer In Residence" at Trinidad's Public Library. In the mid-1990s he served as a Senator in the Parliament of Trinidad and Tobago. He then made Birmingham, England, his permanent base and was appointed its sixth Poet Laureate for 2001–02. As a cultural ambassador he hosted numerous readings by writers and actively promoted literature development internationally as well as himself lecturing and performing at many schools, universities, cultural and social venues.

Dr Kwabena was renowned for using critical analysis to examine the historical roots of racism and to assess the direct relevance this has on present society. He also championed wide-ranging issues such as functional and cultural literacy, therapeutic harvesting of memories by elders and young people (including cross generational dialogue), Community Cohesion, Social Inclusion, Cultural Diversity, redefining the heritages of indigenous peoples, plus confidence building for convicted prisoners, excluded and traumatized students, refugees, etc.

In 2007, Roi Kwabena was included among activists, artists, campaigners, sport and media personalities on a wall celebrating efforts of The World's Black Achievers: Past and Present at the Liverpool-based International Slavery Museum.

Kwabena died on 9 January 2008, one day after being diagnosed with lung cancer at a hospital in London - prior to this, doctors had been treating him for pneumonia. His funeral took place in London on 26 January 2008 and he was cremated two days later. His ashes were flown to Trinidad.

Bibliography
Lament of the Soul (poetry), 1974
Insight (poetry/essay), 1975
Follow de Path (poetry), 1980
Marijuana (thesis), 1981
Vegetable & Fruit Juices (health), 1982
C.U.R.E. 84 (health journal), 1983
C.U.R.E. 85 (ibid), 1985
In other words (poetry) 1986
Black Molasses /Brown Sugar (journal), 1986
Seasons of Exile (poetry), 1986
About the Caribbean (socio-geography), 1986
Sojourn: towards victory (travel journal and history), 1988
Profile 96 (journal of culture), 1994
Manifestations: selected poems 1985-95 (poetry), 1997
Destiny (journal black history), 1997
Kush Reclaimed (poetry/ history), 1987/1997–1998
Nubian Saints of Christianity (history), 1997–1998
Nubian Glory: our heritage (anthropology/history), 1999
A Job for the Hangman (poetry), 1999
Never Trouble, Trouble (children stories), 1999
Ancient Inscriptions & Sacred Texts of Ethiopia (anthropology), 2000
Whether or Not (poetry/history; Raka Publications), 2001
As Long As (poetry), 2005
Muse of Maps, Muurs, Mounds & Mysteries (essay), 2006
DIALOGUE (journal for Cultural Literacy), 2006–2007
Orisha Songs for Celina (poetry), 2006
In the Moment (Poetry), 2006
Making of TA-MERI-KA: Black Women in Time (Anthropology), 2006

Discography 
Y42K – Spoken Word CD- 2000–2006 (blueplanetsound, UK & Bembe Productions)

References

External links
Poems and introductions Post-Colonial Literature of the Caribbean
Cultural Literacy blog by Roi Kwabena
"Roi Kwabena - Birmingham's Poet Laureate 2001 - 2002"
National Research and Development Centre for adult literacy and numeracy
Website dedicated to Roi Kwabena's life's work

Trinidad and Tobago non-fiction writers
1956 births
2008 deaths
Deaths from lung cancer in England
20th-century male writers
21st-century male writers